Julie Wolfthorn (8 January 1864 – 26 December 1944) was a German painter. Born as Julie Wolf(f) to a middle-class Jewish family, she later styled herself as Julie Wolfthorn after Thorn (Toruń), her city of birth.

Life

Wolfthorn was born in Thorn (Toruń) in the Prussian Province of Prussia. In 1883, she moved to Berlin to live with her relatives after her parents died. In 1890, she studied in Curt Herrmann's Drawing and Painting School for ladies. Since German art academies would not permit women, she traveled to Paris to study at the Académie Colarossi and Académie Julian, where she gained much of the skills needed to become successful. After she finished her studies in Paris, Wolfthorn returned to Berlin. In 1898, she became the co-founder of the Berlin Secession and the "Verein der Künstlerinnen und Kunstfreunde Berlin" (Association of Artists and Art Lovers Berlin). In 1905, Julie Wolfthorn and over 200 female artists signed a petition to be allowed to join the Prussian Academy of Arts, which was ultimately rejected by the academy director Anton von Werner.

With Käthe Kollwitz, she founded the exhibition cooperation "Verbindung Bildender Künstlerinnen". The two women are elected to directors of the "Secession" in 1912, but she and Fanny Remak are removed in 1933. Julie Wolfthorn stayed in Berlin, working with the "Kulturbund Deutscher Juden" (Cultural Association of German Jews) under pressure from the Nazis, which declared it illegal in 1941, arresting the members and seizing the possessions.

On 28 October 1942, 78-year-old Julie Wolfthorn and her sister Luise Wolf who, like all other family members except the painter called themselves Wolff or Wolf, were transported to the Theresienstadt concentration camp. Wolfthorn is said to have continued drawing, as far as possible under the circumstances, until her death on 26 December 1944.

Work

Known best for her portraits, Wolfthorn was one of the leading female artists at the start of the 20th century, along with Käthe Kollwitz and Dora Hitz.  She created portraits of hundreds of famous people from her time from Berlin, including many female activists.  Some of the most famous subjects of her portraits include:

Ida and Richard Dehmel
Marlene Dietrich
Hedda Eulenberg
Hedwig Lachmann
Gustav Landauer
the families of the architects Hermann Muthesius and Peter Behrens
Dagny Juel-Przybyszewska
Gabriele Reuter
Grete and Conrad Ansorge
Tilla Durieux
Maria Orska
Carola Neher
Bjørn Bjørnson
Margarethe and Gerhart Hauptmann
Emilie and Rudolf Mosse
Christian Rohlfs

Literature
 Breuer, Gerda. Meer, Julia (Ed.): Women in Graphic Design, Jovis. Berlin, 2012. , p. 403 ff, 587-588
 Heike Carstensen: Die Malerin und Graphikerin Julie Wolfthorn (1864 - 1944). Rekonstruktion eines Künstlerinnenleben, Marburg 2011.
 Hedwig Brenner: Jüdische Frauen in der bildenden Kunst II. Konstanz 2004.
 Jugend Jg. 2, No. 47, cover design, 1897.

References

External links

Biography at Julie-Wolfthorn.de
Julie Wolfthorn past auction works
Berlin-Women: Julie Wolfthorn
Curt Herrmann Biography

People from the Province of Prussia
People from Toruń
German people who died in the Theresienstadt Ghetto
1864 births
1944 deaths
19th-century German painters
20th-century German painters
Académie Julian alumni
Académie Colarossi alumni